Nie wierzcie elektrykom (Polish Don't trust the electricians) is the second studio album of the punk rock band Big Cyc, released in 1991. The title is a pun on "Don't trust the politicians" and it alludes to Lech Wałęsa's profession. The president of Poland was also depicted on the cover in a rather iconoclastic way, dressed in a jacket with a Playboy badge (as opposed to Virgin Mary badge, actually worn by Wałęsa). The album emulated a radio show, the songs being separated by nonsense dialogues of two "hosts", Skiba and Paweł "Konjo" Konnak.

Track listing
"Marian, wierny kibic" (Marian, a faithful football fan)
"Chrześcijańscy kanibale" (Christian cannibals)
"Oszukani partyzanci" (Deceived partisans)
"Nie ma tu nikogo" (There's nobody here)
"Polacy" (The Poles)
"Biały miś" (White Bear)
"Kanar?" (Ticket Controller?)
"Ruskie idą" (The Russians are coming)
"Nie wierzcie elektrykom" (Don't trust the electricians)
"Karel rege" (Karel Reggae)

Credits
Dżej Dżej – bass guitar, lead vocals
Dżery – drums, vocals
Piękny Roman – lead guitar, vocals
Skiba – vocals, lyrics, 'radio host'

Guest starring:
Marek Piekarczyk - vocals on Biały miś
Paweł "Konjo" Konnak - 'radio host'

1991 albums
Big Cyc albums
Songs about activists
Cultural depictions of Lech Wałęsa